Salt Trading Corporation (STC) is a Nepalese company  founded in 1963 for the purpose of regularising the distribution primarily of salt but also sugar, wheat, oil, rice, other grains, tea, LP gas, paper, coal and tyres for vehicles.

References

Food and drink companies of Nepal
Salt industry
Trading companies
1963 establishments in Nepal